Project Socrates was a classified U.S. Defense Intelligence Agency program established in 1983 within the Reagan administration.  It was founded and directed by physicist Michael C. Sekora to determine why the United States was unable to maintain economic competitiveness—and to rectify the situation.

According to Project Socrates: [B]ird’s eye view of competition went far beyond, in terms of scope and completeness, the extremely narrow slices of data that were available to the professors, professional economists, and consultants that addressed the issue of competitiveness.  The conclusions that the Socrates team derived about competitiveness in general and about the U.S. in particular were in almost all cases in direct opposition to what the professors, economists and consultants had been saying for years, and to what had been accepted as irrefutable underlying truths by decision-makers throughout the U.S.

When Reagan's presidential term ended and the Bush administration came to the White House, Project Socrates was labeled as "industrial policy", and began to fall from favor.  As a result, in April 1990, the program was defunded.

Early history

In 1983 Sekora was an intelligence officer within the U.S. Defense Intelligence Agency (DIA), working on preventing the flow of western military technologies to the Soviet Union.  At the time, the intelligence agencies of the Soviet Union like the KGB and GRU were very aggressive in their efforts to acquire technology from the United States as well as from various other western countries like France and Germany. They were using a multitude of covert and overt, legal and illegal means to acquire western military technologies. For example, DIA would block KGB's acquisition of a sensitive U.S. technology that the KGB had trans-shipped through an intricate maze of front companies throughout Africa (it turns out that the KGB was ultimately successful by trans-shipping it through European front companies).

It became clear that the United States' technology policy was radically different from the policies of all the other countries that Sekora had interacted with. The U.S. technology policy consisted primarily of protection in the form of export controls to prevent the flow of U.S.-developed technology to military adversaries. In contrast, the technology policies of all other countries of the world addressed the flow of technology both into and out of the country.  Surprisingly, this was the policy of both U.S. adversaries and allied countries, and it was used by the countries to address both their military as well as commercial technologies.

The U.S. approach was premised on the notion that all technology of value to the United States was in the United States, that the most effective means to have the technology was to execute internal research and development (R&D), so therefore, the only necessary national technology policy was to prevent its flow out of the country. In addition, only the flow of U.S. military critical technologies to the United States' military adversaries needed to be restricted.

So while the U.S. approach to technology policy was focused on simply reducing the flow of military technology, its ability to generate an economic competitive advantage was starting to rapidly deteriorate in several key industries, including the U.S. auto industry. By contrast, other countries were executing strategies to manage the flows of commercial and military technologies into and out of their respective countries to systematically and efficiently build their economic and military strengths.

Sekora concluded that in order for the United States to remain competitive, economically and militarily, the United States must abandon its simplistic approach to technology and execute strategies that managed the flows of technology into and out of the country in a manner that was superior to that which was executed by all its military competitors and commercial adversaries. The rest of the world was playing chess with the world's technologies, and the United States had to become the grand master of technology chess.

Sekora thereafter initiated the Socrates Project within the Defense Intelligence Agency.

Mission

The Socrates Project from its inception had a twofold mission. First was to determine the true underlying cause of the United States' declining competitiveness. Second was to use this understanding to develop the means to rebuild America's competitiveness.

In the early 1980s, it was becoming apparent to some people that the United States was losing its competitiveness. However, the Socrates team saw that what amounted to "one-liner" explanations of the reasons for the United States' declining competitiveness (e.g., "Japan, Inc.", "A non-level playing field")—which were widely distributed and fully accepted—were too superficial for Socrates' mission of rebuilding America's competitiveness, and were not supported by what was seen while working on the issue of preventing the Soviets from acquiring Western technology.

To determine the source of the U.S. competitiveness problem, Project Socrates assembled an all-source intelligence system which enabled the project to examine competition on a global scale. The combination of deep intelligence and digital data provided a bird's-eye, holistic view of all forms of competition worldwide.

Socrates' discoveries
Project Socrates identified five key mental shifts which had to take place in order to restore the United States' competitive edge:

 Decision-makers must revert to technology exploitation (i.e., the acquisition and utilization of technology to include R&D) as the foundation for their decision-making—technology-based planning.
 The exploitation of the technology is the most effective foundation for decision making for the complete set of functions within the private and public sectors that determine U.S. competitiveness.
 To exploit technology more effectively than its competitors, the United States must generate and lead the next evolutionary step in technology exploitation—the automated innovation revolution.
 A system was developed within the Socrates Project of the U.S. intelligence community, and then refined in the private sector, that would enable the United States to generate and lead the automated innovation revolution providing U.S. private and public organizations with the ability to generate and maintain a major competitive advantage over all competitors worldwide for many generations.
 The automated innovation system would, in addition, enable the U.S. private and public organizations to execute automated innovation in a manner that would enable the full range of U.S. resources to be exploited in a highly coherent, flexible, and independent fashion, further increasing the competitive advantages achieved and maintained by the U.S. organizations.

References 

Defense Intelligence Agency
Economic history of the United States
Cold War history of the United States